Connecticut Ice is an annual ice hockey event celebrating the tradition and progress of youth and amateur hockey in the state of Connecticut. The 3-day event is headlined by a 4-team tournament with participation from all of the state's four Division I programs: Connecticut, Quinnipiac, Sacred Heart and Yale.

History
After years of organization, the first event was finally arranged for late January in 2020. In addition to the collegiate tournament, the 3-day event includes youth tournaments from various levels of junior ice hockey.

SportsNet New York agreed to broadcast all four games of the tournament.

In 2021, in what was supposed to be the second edition of the tournament, the event was cancelled due to the COVID-19 pandemic. Among other problems, the virus had led Yale to cancel its entire season.

Yearly Results

References

External link

College ice hockey tournaments in the United States
Events in Connecticut
Recurring sporting events established in 2020
2020 establishments in Connecticut
Ice hockey in Connecticut